Juan Rivera may refer to:
Juan Rivera (explorer) (fl. 1765), Spanish explorer of North America
Juan Rivera (baseball) (born 1978), major league baseball outfielder
Juan Rivera (born 1964), American wrestler, better known by his stage name Savio Vega
Juan Rivera (wrongful conviction) (born 1972), American wrongfully convicted three times of a rape and murder
Juan Rivera (singer), American singer and actor
Juan Ríus Rivera (1848–1924), Puerto Rican soldier in the Cuban Liberation Army
Juan Rullán Rivera (1884–unk.), Puerto Rican politician, mayor of Mayagüez 1921–1932